The following list is the list of the ranking of the universities in the People's Republic of China in the specialized subject of Journalism and Communication. The ranking is made by China Academic Degrees & Graduate Education Development Center (an administrative department directly under the Ministry of Education, P.R.C) in 2009.

References

China
Journalism and Communication